Ganjevan (also Romanized as Ganjevān; also known as Kanjavān) is a village in Boli Rural District, Chavar District, Ilam County, Ilam Province, Iran. At the 2006 census, its population was 349, in 82 families. The village is populated by Kurds.

References 

Populated places in Ilam County
Kurdish settlements in Ilam Province